Mary Mouse is a fictional character "imagined" by Enid Blyton, a prolific British children's author, in the mid 20th century. Mary Mouse is a mouse exiled from her mousehole who becomes a maid at the dolls' house, employed by Sailor Doll.

The original publications were in an unusual format,  softback pictorial. Due to the austerity and paper shortages of the times, during and after World War II, the first editions were cheaply made with simple colour illustration and stapled bindings overstuck with linen edging.

Loved mainly by girls, this character's memory has lived on. The original books (published by Brockhampton Press of Leicester at a price of one shilling) are highly collectable, perhaps because few remain in reasonable condition. The books were immensely popular in Blyton's days and eventually sold one million copies.

Books

 Mary Mouse and the Dolls' House (1942), illustrated by Olive F. Openshaw
 More Adventures of Mary Mouse (1943), illustrated by Olive F. Openshaw
 Little Mary Mouse Again (1944), illustrated by Olive F. Openshaw
 Hello, Little Mary Mouse (1945), illustrated by Olive F. Openshaw
 Mary Mouse and Her Family (1946), illustrated by Olive F. Openshaw
 Here Comes Mary Mouse Again (1947), illustrated by Olive F. Openshaw
 How Do You Do, Mary Mouse (1948), illustrated by Olive F. Openshaw
 We Do Love Mary Mouse (1950), illustrated by Olive F. Openshaw
 Welcome, Mary Mouse (1950), illustrated by Olive F. Openshaw
 Hurrah for Mary Mouse (1951), illustrated by Olive F. Openshaw
 A Prize for Mary Mouse (1951), illustrated by Olive F. Openshaw
 Mary Mouse and Her Bicycle (1952), illustrated by Olive F. Openshaw
 Mary Mouse and the Noah's Ark (1952), illustrated by Olive F. Openshaw
 Mary Mouse to the Rescue (1954), illustrated by Olive F. Openshaw
 Mary Mouse in Nursery Rhyme Land (1955), illustrated by Olive F. Openshaw
 A Day with Mary Mouse (1956), illustrated by Frederick White
 Mary Mouse and the Garden Party (1957), illustrated by Frederick White
 Mary Mouse Goes to the Fair (1958), illustrated by Frederick White
 Mary Mouse Has a Wonderful Idea (1959), illustrated by Frederick White
 Mary Mouse Goes to Sea (1960), illustrated by Frederick White
 Mary Mouse Goes Out for the Day (1961), illustrated by Frederick White
 Fun with Mary Mouse (1962), illustrated by R. Paul-Hoye
 Mary Mouse and the Little Donkey (1964), illustrated by R. Paul-Hoye

References

Book series introduced in 1942
Female characters in literature
Literary characters introduced in 1942
Fictional mice and rats
Enid Blyton series